Calzada District is one of six districts of the province Moyobamba in Peru. Calzada is a small town and has 3,586 inhabitants according to a 2017 census.

References